Regional elections in Italy took place during 2018 in six regions out of twenty including Lazio and Lombardy (4 March), Molise (22 April), Friuli-Venezia Giulia (29 April), Aosta Valley (20 May) and Trentino-Alto Adige/Südtirol (21 October).

Overall results

Regional councils

Presidents of the regions

Results by region

Lombardy

Lazio

Molise

Friuli-Venezia Giulia

Aosta Valley

Trentino-Alto Adige

Trentino

South Tyrol

External links
Ministry of the Interior – Historical Archive of Elections (Results of Lombardy)
Ministry of the Interior (Results of Lazio)

Region of Friuli-Venezia Giulia – Results
Autonomous Region of Aosta Valley – Results
Autonomous Province of Trento – Results
Province of Bolzano – Results

Elections in Italian regions
2018 elections in Italy
March 2018 events in Italy
April 2018 events in Italy